Xmark93 is a standardized benchmarking tool for measuring the performance of computer systems running the X Window System.  It was developed by the SPEC XPC group in 1993.

Xmark93 allows systems evaluators and vendors to compare the performance of X server/hardware systems for a broad set of X basic functions, covering a wide range of applications. The benchmark provides a standardized method for summarizing X11perf results, providing a single-number measure of overall X11 server/hardware performance.

Specifications
Xmark93 is derived by calculating the ratio between the geometrically weighted mean of the 447 individual X11perf tests for the server/hardware being evaluated and the corresponding results from a Sun Microsystems SPARCstation 1. Weightings for each of the X11perf tests were obtained by   a survey of X11 technical experts. The weightings reflect the experts' ratings of the relative importance of individual X11perf operations within a wide mix of applications.

Benchmarks (computing)
X Window System